"Take That" is a 2009 single from British grime artist Wiley & Dutch producer Chew Fu. It was released on 28 December 2009.

Track listings

iTunes tracks
 "Take That" (Radio Edit) - 2:45
 "Take That" (Extended Mix) - 5:42
 "Take That" (Doorly Remix) - 5:45
 "Take That" (Doorly Dubstep Mix) - 4:09
 "Take That" (BBK vs. Roll Deep vs. Fire Camp Remix) - 4:47
 "Take That" (Sketch Iz Dead Remix) - 4:06

Chart performance

Following a release in late December 2009, "Take That" first entered the UK Singles Chart on 3 January 2010, where it charted at #22. The following week, on 10 January 2010, "Take That" rose by 2 places, to reach its peak of #20. 
As of 4 January 2011 the single has sold 70,000 units in the UK.

References

2009 singles
Wiley (musician) songs
2009 songs
Island Records singles
Songs written by Wiley (musician)